Mahlagha Jambozorg (born 15 August 1991) is an Iranian sports shooter. She competed in the 10 m air rifle event at the 2012 Olympics and in the 50 m rifle 3 positions at the 2012 and 2016 Olympics with the best result of 14th place in the 50 m rifle in 2012. She won a bronze medal in this event at the 2018 Asian Games.

She was selected as the flag bearer for Iran at the 2017 Islamic Solidarity Games.

References

External links
 

1991 births
Living people
Iranian female sport shooters
Olympic shooters of Iran
Shooters at the 2012 Summer Olympics
Shooters at the 2016 Summer Olympics
People from Hamadan
Asian Games silver medalists for Iran
Asian Games bronze medalists for Iran
Asian Games medalists in shooting
Shooters at the 2010 Asian Games
Shooters at the 2014 Asian Games
Shooters at the 2018 Asian Games
Medalists at the 2010 Asian Games
Medalists at the 2018 Asian Games
Universiade medalists in shooting
Universiade gold medalists for Iran
Universiade silver medalists for Iran
Universiade bronze medalists for Iran
Medalists at the 2015 Summer Universiade
Islamic Solidarity Games competitors for Iran
Islamic Solidarity Games medalists in shooting
21st-century Iranian women